Ragnar Tveiten (born 27 November 1938) is a former Norwegian biathlete. He participated on the Norwegian team that received a gold medal in 4 × 7.5 km relay in the 1966 Biathlon World Championships in Garmisch-Partenkirchen. He won a second gold medal in 4 × 7.5 km relay in the 1967 world championships in Altenberg. He received silver medals in 1969, 1970, 1971 and 1973.

Biathlon results
All results are sourced from the International Biathlon Union.

Olympic Games

*The relay was added as an event in 1968.

World Championships
6 medals (2 gold, 4 silver)

*During Olympic seasons competitions are only held for those events not included in the Olympic program.
**The team (time) event was removed in 1965, whilst the relay was added in 1966.

References

External links
 

1938 births
Living people
People from Rollag
Norwegian male biathletes
Biathletes at the 1964 Winter Olympics
Biathletes at the 1968 Winter Olympics
Biathletes at the 1972 Winter Olympics
Olympic biathletes of Norway
Biathlon World Championships medalists
Sportspeople from Viken (county)